Hafia (Pular: 𞤂𞤫𞤧-𞤯𞤢𞤤𞤭𞥅𞤪𞤫 𞤢𞥄𞤬𞤭𞤴𞤢) is a town and sub-prefecture in the Labé Prefecture in the Labé Region of northern-central Guinea.

References

Sub-prefectures of the Labé Region